A national recreation area (NRA) is a protected area in the United States established by an Act of Congress to preserve enhanced recreational opportunities in places with significant natural and scenic resources. There are 40 NRAs, which emphasize a variety of activities for visitors, including hiking, camping, boating, fishing, swimming, biking, horseback riding, and wildlife viewing, in areas that include multiple-use management for both conservation and limited utilization of natural resources. They have diverse features and contexts, being established around reservoirs, in urban areas, and within forests. Due to their size, diversity of activities, and proximity to population centers, NRAs are among the most visited units of the National Park System, with six among the thirty most visited sites.

The first NRA was Lake Mead National Recreation Area, which was created by a 1936 agreement between the United States Bureau of Reclamation (USBR), which had built Hoover Dam, and the National Park Service (NPS), which had experience in managing visitors in the outdoors. Because the reservoir had disturbed the natural state of the environment, a new designation was devised that allowed for more intensive land use while maintaining the NPS's role in conservation and historic preservation. The system of NRAs grew as the USBR constructed more dams near urban areas where there was a need for outdoor recreation.

NRAs are managed by the NPS, the United States Forest Service (USFS), and the Bureau of Land Management (BLM). Of the NPS's 18 sites, 12 are based around large reservoirs emphasizing water recreation, 5 are near urban areas and include both historic preservation and outdoor recreation, and the last is at a river where a reservoir was planned but not built. Of the USFS's 22 sites, 5 are at or near reservoirs, and the rest are other exemplary recreation sites within national forests.

The 40 NRAs are located in 26 states; California and Washington have the most, each with four.

History

Origin 

The U.S. Bureau of Reclamation was planning the construction of Boulder Dam (now Hoover Dam) on the Colorado River in the late 1920s and saw the potential for recreation at the scenic area in Nevada and Arizona around the future Lake Mead, to then be the world's largest reservoir. The car was expanding access to travel in the growing Southwest and the USBR wanted to bring about the outdoor activities that would be enabled by its enormous project, but it lacked the experience and desire to provide facilities and services for recreation. Following the controversy of the Hetch Hetchy Reservoir that flooded a scenic valley in Yosemite National Park, the National Park Service sought to balance its conservation and recreation efforts with dams, and it could provide the expertise for such visitor infrastructure at the Boulder Canyon Project.

A proposed  Virgin National Park in that region promoted by Secretary of the Interior Ray Lyman Wilbur was praised for its scenic and historic resources but rejected in 1930 by NPS Director Horace M. Albright due to a reservoir's inherent lack of a natural landscape expected for a national park. The political leaders at the Department of the Interior nevertheless wanted to manage the significant lands for tourism and recreation. Farming interests in the Arizona Strip area also wanted to keep their grazing access to the public lands. A 1932 study by Yellowstone National Park superintendent Roger Toll evaluated the region and recognized some sites of interest but again dismissed it as inconsistent with national parks' and monuments' standards and purpose of preservation. Separately that year the secretary's advisor Louis C. Cramton led further studies of the area between the dam site and Grand Canyon National Park and recommended the creation of Grand Canyon National Monument (II) for the pristine upstream eastern section; it would later be incorporated into the park. Cramton proposed that the western section, which had less spectacular scenery, the dam and reservoir, livestock grazing, and mining, but nationally important recreational importance, be designated as the "Boulder Canyon National Reservation", consistent with terminology used in the National Park Service Organic Act. A bill to establish it was introduced in Congress in 1933 with mixed support and failed to advance, while Albright reluctantly agreed to support the USBR with visitor services.

As part of the New Deal, President Franklin D. Roosevelt strongly promoted tourism to a growing NPS, with increased emphasis on recreation at facilities constructed by the job-creating Civilian Conservation Corps. The Park Service, now under Director Arno B. Cammerer, took advantage of federal funds to claim the reservoir area and highlight natural features and development needs. Despite the lack of legislation establishing the reservation, the USBR's inability to manage the influx of tourists at the newly finished Lake Mead led Interior Secretary Harold L. Ickes to direct for negotiation of a memorandum of agreement that gave the NPS responsibility for the reserved lands and surface of the lake, but not Boulder Dam itself, maintaining mining and grazing so long as they did not disrupt recreation. Ickes signed it on October 13, 1936, establishing the Boulder Dam Recreation Area, and the NPS quickly built significant infrastructure for sightseeing visitors and contracted with concessionaires. This was a major compromise and precedent that expanded the Park Service's mission beyond the strict conservation of national parks and monuments to include broader outdoor recreation that coexists with other land uses.

Further development 
The Park, Parkway, and Recreation Area Study Act of 1936 had the NPS analyze the needs for outdoor recreation and collaborate with state and local governments, officially expanding its mission beyond national parks. With skepticism remaining among agency veterans, planning at the area still emphasized scenery and preservation. The Act's mandates and provision for interagency cooporation however resulted in more versatile land acquisition as the NPS defined its mission. In the 1940s, under the leadership of associate director Conrad L. Wirth, the NPS prepared a National Recreation Plan and conducted a number of studies with the USBR and the United States Army Corps of Engineers (USACE) assessing the natural impact, recreational opportunities, and significance of proposed reservoirs.

In 1947 the Boulder Dam Recreation Area was renamed Lake Mead National Recreation Area and expanded to include Lake Mohave above the USBR's new Davis Dam. This interagency partnership was successful in creating many recreation areas at reservoirs: nine more were created by agreement with USBR and two more with other dam agencies in the next two decades under the leadership of Wirth as director. However, it contributed to the controversial proposals of Echo Park Dam and Bridge Canyon Dam in existing NPS areas that were canceled after considerable opposition from environmentalists.

These new sites were mainly designated as just "recreation areas" since they did not necessarily have national significance. Several would be transferred to the United States Forest Service and other agencies, being more efficient for management. USFS took over Shasta Lake Recreation Area in Shasta National Forest in 1948 as its first. The Forest Service had traditionally focused on forestry for timber and custodial management, and the 1950s saw debate among the agencies, extraction interests, and conservationists as demand for recreation increased the need for multiple-use planning. The Multiple-Use Sustained-Yield Act of 1960 for the first time established recreation as well as wildlife as an equal priority for the Forest Service with range, timber, and watershed oversight.

The Park Service took a utilitarian approach to its recreation areas, acknowledging their less-than-national significance and focused on providing useful facilities and allowing a wider range of activities. Through the 1950s, many traditionalists at the NPS saw recreation areas championed by Wirth as distractions with open questions of how to manage and square them with the broader aims of the agency. As increased visitation forced answers to these, Lake Mead served as a model for administration at other recreational units, experiencing changing demands of the public, with more day-use visitors. Wirth advocated for changing the Lake Mead's designation to "national recreation park," which would emphasize its importance with autonomy from the USBR. His Mission 66 vision provided capital investment for construction of visitor services and infrastructure across the park system.

Standardization and expansion 
In 1963, the Recreation Advisory Council, created by executive order of President John F. Kennedy and composed of five major government officials, issued a policy that recognized the need for and established criteria for establishing NRAs. The council recommended that NRAs should focus on growing "recreation demand" more than preservation, conservation, or development; have significant natural and recreational quality greater than that of state lands, even if not as unique as other parts of the National Park System; and provide opportunity for recreation consistent with other federal public lands programs. It outlined seven mandatory criteria and six secondary criteria for establishing NRAs, including a minimum size, ability to attract a significant number of visitors from nearby and beyond its state, and filling a regional need with recreation as the dominant purpose. The policy also called for national recreation areas to be established by acts of Congress and for them to be able to be managed by multiple agencies as necessary, including as partnerships with states. The Bureau of Outdoor Recreation (rather than the NPS) was charged with studying proposals and referring them to the council for recommendation. This process gave flexibility to the NPS and USFS to develop their own guidelines for unmet future recreational needs.

In response Congress made Lake Mead National Recreation Area the first such area to be established by statute in October 1964, finally resolving the complicated co-management of USBR land as sole NPS jurisdiction. It eventually codified most of the existing recreation areas under the new national designation (Lake Roosevelt and Curecanti NRAs are the only NPS areas that have not been permanently established by Congress or the president). Lake Mead is still the largest NRA and is the most visited among those at reservoirs. The first new NRA under USFS administration was Spruce Knob–Seneca Rocks National Recreation Area, established in 1965. Congress initially authorized Delaware Water Gap NRA in 1965 with the expectation that the Tocks Island Reservoir would serve the New York and Philadelphia areas as the first NRA east of the Mississippi River, but local and environmental opposition led to the dam's cancellation. The NRA remains as the forested area intended to be flooded by the Delaware River. Mount Rogers NRA was also delayed and downsized, losing a planned reservoir and ski area.

A 1968 NPS publication outlined policies for administration of recreational areas, which were distinct from its natural and historical areas. This included not only NRAs but also national lakeshores and seashores, national parkways, and some national scenic riverways; at that time there were 22 such areas, and recreation would be the dominant resource objective, but with multiple intensive uses allowed. But because most units contained a combination of natural, historic, and recreational lands, the General Authorities Act of 1970 made all areas equal within the National Park System; separate policy manuals for each were replaced in 1975 with one that would tailor policies in each park respective to the purpose of zones within.

In 1972 Congress established two NRAs in urban areas as the first urban national parks: Golden Gate NRA in the San Francisco area and Gateway NRA in New York City, both with beaches, historic military sites, and natural conservation areas. Spearheaded by Director George Hartzog, this controversially expanded the Park Service's responsibilities into local urban recreation (in addition to the National Capital Parks), and after he left, the NPS opposed the creation of Cuyahoga Valley NRA south of Cleveland and Santa Monica Mountains NRA west of Los Angeles. The former was redesignated a national park in 2000. Chattahoochee River NRA north of Atlanta was created in 1978 and Boston Harbor Islands NRA in 1996. The Santa Monica Mountains and Boston Harbor Islands are partnerships with state parks and local agencies.

Mount Hood is the newest NRA, designated in 2009. The Land and Water Conservation Fund provided funding for the purchase of land at several NRAs.

Management
Three federal agencies manage the 40 NRAs. The National Park Service, in the Department of the Interior, manages 18, the U.S. Forest Service, in the Department of Agriculture, manages 22, and the Bureau of Land Management, in the Department of the Interior, manages one. One NRA, Whiskeytown–Shasta–Trinity, comprises three units, two of which are Forest Service and one is National Park Service. The NPS sites are stand-alone units of the National Park System, while the USFS sites are all part of national forests except Land Between the Lakes. Several of the larger USFS NRAs are managed equivalent to a ranger district, but most are designated areas within one. The Green Mountain National Forest is the only one with two NRAs. The Forest Service manages its NRAs as "showcases" of its management standards so that their programs, services, and facilities should be better than and models for its other recreation sites. The USBR operates dams in the West, with eleven NRAs built around them, while the USACE primarily operates dams in the East, with reservoirs or areas near four part of NRAs; three more are based around reservoirs operated by other agencies.

As the primary focus of land management is recreation (rather than conservation), limited land use such as grazing, logging, and mineral leasing is permitted only if it does not interfere with the recreational use of the land. The establishing legislation of each NRA usually specifies multiple purposes of the designation. Hunting is by default banned in areas of the National Park Service unless explicitly permitted by law; 15 of 18 NRAs of the NPS allow hunting – and it is generally permitted in National Forest lands – in accordance with local rules.

List of national recreation areas 
The Mississippi National River and Recreation Area and Big South Fork National River and Recreation Area share many features with the NRAs but are classified by the NPS with the national rivers and are not listed here. The USFS has four additional designated "recreation areas" that have similar management practices but are not listed here. The USFS and BLM do not collect visitor data for most sites, marked with an asterisk.

See also 

List of areas in the United States National Park System: National recreation areas
Recreational Demonstration Area
Protected areas of the United States
List of national parks of the United States
List of national monuments of the United States
List of national memorials of the United States
List of national lakeshores and seashores of the United States

References

External links

National Park System
Other Congressionally Designated Areas – US Forest Service
Congressionally Designated Special Management Areas in the National Forest System – Congressional Research Service

 01
 01
Recreation
Outdoor recreation
Recreation